Bumblebee (Karen Beecher-Duncan) is a superheroine appearing in American comic books published by DC Comics and other related media, commonly as a member of the Teen Titans. She first appeared as Karen in December 1976's Teen Titans (volume 1) #45, and adopted the Bumblebee identity three issues later. Historically, Bumblebee is sometimes considered DC Comics' first Black woman superhero character, though this distinction is also accorded to Nubia, a less traditional costumed crimefighter than Bumblebee, who debuted several years earlier in 1973.

Publication history
Karen Beecher first appeared in Teen Titans #45 and was created by writer Bob Rozakis and artist Irv Novick. Her Bumblebee alias first appeared in Teen Titans #48.

Character biography

Teen Titans
Scientist Karen Beecher is the girlfriend of Teen Titans member the Herald (a.k.a. Mal Duncan). To help make Herald look good in front of the team, Karen secretly made herself a bumblebee-themed supersuit and attacked the Teen Titans. She escaped without her true identity being revealed.

When she later explained to Mal and the Titans what she had done, they were impressed enough to offer her membership, which she accepted. She and Mal subsequently moved to the new Titans West team, having relocated to San Francisco. When the Titans team dissolved for a time, Karen and Mal married and 'retired' from superheroics. Karen took a job with S.T.A.R. Labs, where she designs non-lethal weaponry.

They have returned to crime-fighting from time to time to assist the team, most notably during a short-lived revival of Titans West and the JLA/Titans event, which reunited everyone involved with the team. A fight broke out over the fate of Victor Stone, Cyborg. Bumblebee personally fought Zauriel, a member of the Justice League. Despite the assistance of the current Supergirl, Bumblebee was swiftly defeated.

Following this, Mal and Karen briefly joined the latest incarnation of Titans West (now called Titans L.A.), but this incarnation of the team never really got off the ground, and the heroes returned to their lives of semi-retirement.

Several years later, Mal and Karen briefly returned to action as part of a team of over two dozen past and present Titans who were called in to stop a rampaging Doctor Light.

Infinite Crisis and One Year Later
Bumblebee and her husband are among the heroes recruited by Donna Troy to help avert a coming crisis that threatened the existence of the universe. After a battle in space, most of the heroes were trapped by a Zeta Beam Ray that Adam Strange was hoping to use for teleporting away the heroes from the rift in space. Due to the ray interactions with the rift itself, the Zeta Ray altered Bumblebee's physiology, apparently transferring her body mass to Hawkgirl. This left Bumblebee approximately six inches in height and temporarily left Hawkgirl some 25 feet tall.

In Teen Titans vol. 3 #34, Bumblebee is shown to have joined the Doom Patrol sometime in the past year along with her husband (now known as Vox) and Beast Boy. She must now take medicine developed by Doom Patrol leader Niles Caulder to prevent her heart from going into cardiac arrest, due to her tiny form.

Much like Beast Boy, she now strongly resembles her animated counterpart in costume and hair style.

Per Birds of Prey #100, Karen—along with numerous other DCU heroines—was contacted by Barbara Gordon and asked to join the expanded roster of the latter's team, the Birds of Prey. However, the team disbanded before she participated in any missions.

Karen is a member of the Doom Patrol. Due to medicinal efforts from Dr. Caulder, she has grown to a height of seven inches, and she can live in a dollhouse.

As of Doom Patrol vol. 5 #1, Karen is now a divorcée. In issue #18, Karen rejoined the team after months of inactivity due to her divorce from Malcolm. Now sporting a new costume and a Beehive hairdo, Karen returned to active duty just in time for a confrontation with the Secret Six, who had come to the team's home of Oolong Island to claim it in the name of a teenaged crime lord. In the ensuing battle, Bumblebee inexplicably vanishes after a brief tussle with Bane, while her teammates ultimately fight the Six to a draw. As the members of the Secret Six are being forcibly deported from Oolong, Elasti-Girl stops Rag Doll and forces him to empty out his pockets, where Karen is found tied up with her mouth duct-taped shut. Ragdoll reluctantly returns Bumblebee to her teammates, telling them that he had wanted to keep her as a "souvenir".

Following the disbandment of the Doom Patrol, Bumblebee appears as one of the former Titans who arrives at Titans Tower to repel Superboy-Prime and the Legion of Doom.

DC Rebirth
In the DC Rebirth continuity, Karen is the pregnant wife of Mal Duncan. She later reveals that she has the power to fire energy blasts from her hands, which comes in handy during the former Teen Titans' battle with Mister Twister. At the end of the fight, she goes into labor and eventually gives birth to a daughter.

Eventually, Karen is taken by Mal to Meta Solutions to evaluate her powers, as it was the same company that took his powers away. Unlike her husband, Karen likes her super powers and wants to find a way to control them. Unbeknownst to them, Meta Solutions is run by Psimon and the Fearsome Five, which Mal realizes after spotting Mammoth in the lobby. Though the Fearsome Five claims to have changed, the Titans investigate their headquarters and come under attack. Karen suits up using a special suit designed for her by Meta Solutions and discovers she has the ability to fly and shrink. She manages to rescue the Titans, but Psimon manages to take away her memories of Mal and her child. She decides to stay with the Titans as Bumblebee until she got her memories back much to Mal's displeasure. She eventually regains them when the Titans battle H.I.V.E. and Donna Troy's evil alternate future counterpart, Troia. She quits being a super hero after the Justice League disbands the Titans to be with her family.

Powers and abilities
Bumblebee originally had no true superpowers and her unique abilities were derived from her scientific superpowered high-tech battle suit. The suit greatly increased her strength, speed, stamina, endurance, agility, reflexes and acted as body armor. It also allowed her to fly, create painful electric blasts that stung like actual bee stings and emit a stream of "honey", actually a powerful adhesive capable of disabling her opponents by miring them in the sticky, yellow goo. She later got stuck at a shrunken size and now possesses superpowers. She can fly and produce exceptionally strong hypersonic blasts.

Other versions
 A toddler version of Bumblebee appears as one of the protagonists of the all-ages Tiny Titans series. Here, she is portrayed as the girlfriend of Plasmus, who is depicted as being more of a gentle giant than an outright villain.
 Bumblebee appears as part of Cyborg's Titans East roster in the Titans Tomorrow storyline. Unlike her canon incarnation, this version of Bumblebee still retained her supersuit and normal height.

In other media

Television

 A young Bumblebee appears in Teen Titans (2003), voiced by T'Keyah Crystal Keymáh. This version is an assertive, highly skilled, and cocky individual who wields twin electric stingers and possesses natural flight and shrinking capabilities. In her first appearances, she works undercover as a student of the H.I.V.E. Academy. Proving immune to Brother Blood's mind control, she was able to earn his trust and learn H.I.V.E.'s motives and secrets until an encounter with Cyborg forces her to blow her cover, though she becomes an honorary member of the Teen Titans. She would later move to Steel City and found Titans East, eventually becoming their leader following Brother Blood's attempt to seek revenge on them and Cyborg.
 Bumblebee appears in Teen Titans Go! (2013), voiced by Ozioma Akagha. This version was formerly a member of the Teen Titans and Titans East, before leaving them both to become a solo hero.
 Karen Beecher appears in Young Justice, voiced by Masasa Moyo. Introduced in "Targets", she is initially a high school student and head of the "Bumblebees" cheerleading team at Happy Harbor High School. As of the second season, Young Justice: Invasion, Beecher has become Bumblebee, joined the Team, and became a protégé and lab assistant to Ray Palmer. As of the third season, Young Justice: Outsiders, Beecher has retired to focus on her relationship with Mal Duncan, scientific studies, and pregnancy, eventually giving birth to a baby girl named Rhea. Due to her being born with a congenital heart defect, Beecher patches a hole in Rhea's heart and activates the latter's metagene.
 Bumblebee appears in DC Super Hero Girls (2019), voiced by Kimberly Brooks. This version is a technologically-minded yet shy and nervous individual.

Film
 An alternate universe incarnation of Karen Beecher makes a cameo appearance in Justice League: Gods and Monsters, voiced by Kari Wahlgren. This version is a scientist in Lex Luthor's "Project Fair Play", a weapons contingency program meant to counter their universe's Justice League if necessary. After three of their fellow scientists are killed, Beecher convenes with the remaining scientists involved, but they are all slaughtered by the Metal Men.
 Bumblebee appears in the DC Animated Movie Universe (DCAMU) film Teen Titans: The Judas Contract, voiced again by Masasa Moyo. This version is a founding member of the Teen Titans who primarily appears in flashbacks.
 Bumblebee makes a cameo appearance in Teen Titans Go! To the Movies.
 Bumblebee makes a non-speaking appearance in a flashback in the DCAMU film Justice League Dark: Apokolips War. She rejoins the Titans to defend Earth from Darkseid, but is killed by Darkseid's Paradooms.
 Bumblebee appears in Teen Titans Go! & DC Super Hero Girls: Mayhem in the Multiverse, voiced again by Kimberly Brooks.

Video games
 Bumblebee appears as an unlockable character in Teen Titans (2006), voiced again by T'Keyah Crystal Keymáh.
 Bumblebee appears as a boss in Superman Returns. This version is a supervillain who is accompanied by a "hive" of clones.
 Bumblebee appears as a playable character in Young Justice: Legacy, voiced again by Masasa Moyo.
 Bumblebee appears in DC Super Hero Girls: Teen Power.

Miscellaneous
 Bumblebee appears in Teen Titans Go! (2004).
 Bumblebee appears in DC Super Hero Girls (2015), voiced by Teala Dunn. This version is a student at Super Hero High.

References

External links
 World of Black Heroes: Bumblebee Biography

Comics characters introduced in 1976
Doom Patrol
DC Comics American superheroes
DC Comics female superheroes 
DC Comics characters who are shapeshifters
DC Comics metahumans
African-American superheroes
Fictional characters who can change size
Fictional female scientists
Fictional characters who can manipulate sound
Fictional characters with energy-manipulation abilities